Treasure House School is a private school established in the year 2007 at Ilupeju, suburb of Lagos, South West Nigeria.

Background
Treasure House School admits pupils between the age of 2 months to 11 years into pre-school, creche and primary school. The school operates extra curriculum which include Cub Scout, Cockery, Redcross etc.

Secondary schools in Lagos State